Jacques Momha (born 7 August 1982) is a Cameroonian former professional footballer who played as a left back.

Club career
Born in Edéa, Momha began his senior career as an 18-year-old in France at RC Strasbourg, spending the vast majority of his spell associated to the reserves, however, and also being loaned to Stade Lavallois of Ligue 2 in the 2005–06 season. He moved to Vitória de Guimarães in July 2006, being sparingly played as the Minho team moved straight from the second division into a third place in the Primeira Liga in the 2007–08 campaign.

After having established himself in the starting line-up, Momha left Vitória in mid-January 2009, signing for Turkish club Gençlerbirliği SK. The following year, in the same month, he joined fellow Süper Lig side Manisaspor.

External links
 
 
 
 
 

1982 births
Living people
Cameroonian footballers
Association football defenders
Ligue 1 players
Ligue 2 players
Championnat National players
RC Strasbourg Alsace players
Stade Lavallois players
Primeira Liga players
Liga Portugal 2 players
Vitória S.C. players
Süper Lig players
Gençlerbirliği S.K. footballers
Manisaspor footballers
Cameroonian expatriate footballers
Expatriate footballers in France
Expatriate footballers in Portugal
Expatriate footballers in Turkey
Cameroonian expatriate sportspeople in France
Cameroonian expatriate sportspeople in Portugal
Cameroonian expatriate sportspeople in Turkey